The 1969 Brown Bears football team was an American football team that represented Brown University during the 1969 NCAA University Division football season. Brown tied for last in the Ivy League. 

In third first season under head coach Len Jardine, the Bears compiled a 2–7 record and were outscored 190 to 95. D. Chenault and P. Foley were the team captains. 

The Bears' 1–6 conference record tied for last in the Ivy League standings. They were outscored by Ivy opponents 180 to 48. 

Brown played its home games at Brown Stadium in Providence, Rhode Island.

Schedule

References

Brown
Brown Bears football seasons
Brown Bears football